St. Martin Island is located off the Garden Peninsula in Delta County in the U.S. state of Michigan. It is the southernmost island in Michigan that is part of a line of islands at the mouth of the bay of Green Bay and is part of the Niagara Escarpment.

Geography
Gravelly Island, Gull Island, and Little Gull Island are approximately two miles to the north and east across the St. Martin Island Passage. Rock Island in Wisconsin is approximately six miles south-southwest, across the Rock Island Passage.

History
In 1864 the Peninsula Railroad was completed to connect Escanaba, Michigan to Negaunee iron mines. Escanaba's maritime commerce "exploded as vessels loaded with ore left the growing port headed for the hungry steel mills along the shores of the eastern lakes." The island and the surrounding reefs are a hazard to navigation, and as early as 1891, the United States Lighthouse Board asked Congress for appropriations to build a light there.

The request for a lighthouse was necessitated by the existence of a shoal that extends out for a mile each way from the island. It took the U.S. Congress eight years to appropriate the funds. St. Martin Island Light was constructed in 1905.

Robert W. Warner of Sturgeon Bay, Wisconsin was the first pilot to land on St. Martin Island in the early 1950s. To this day, no one else has traveled to the island by air.

The Fred Luber family bought roughly 94% of the island (1,244 acres) in the 1980s, intending to build a resort. The remote location made development difficult and the island was left unimproved. The Nature Conservancy bought the island in 2013, intending to donate it to the Green Bay National Wildlife Refuge as it is an important bird stopover point. St. Martin Island and the lighthouse are off limits to the public.

Note
"St. Martin Island" may also refer to islands in Mackinac County, Michigan.

In popular culture
The 1982 Canadian slasher film Humongous is set on St. Martin Island.

References

Islands of Delta County, Michigan
Niagara Escarpment
Islands of Lake Michigan in Michigan